Shinkot (also Pasaband) is a town and the center of Pasaband District, in the southern part of Ghor province, Afghanistan.

Climate
Shinkot has a humid continental climate (Köppen: Dsb) with warm, dry summers and cold, snowy winters.

See also 
 List of cities in Afghanistan

References 

Populated places in Ghor Province